Carola Neher (born Karola Neher; 2 November 1900 – 26 June 1942) was a German actress and singer.

Biography

Neher was born in Munich in 1900. She started to work as a bank clerk in 1917. In the summer of 1920, she made her debut performance at the Baden-Baden theatre without a specific stage education, later also working at the theaters of Darmstadt, Nuremberg and at the Munich Kammerspiele. In 1924, Neher started to work at the Lobe-Theater Breslau, where she met Therese Giehse and Peter Lorre.

On 7 May 1925 she married Alfred Henschke (the poet Klabund), who had followed her from Munich to Breslau, at that time already a well known and successful poet. The first performance of his Circle of Chalk ("Der Kreidekreis") turned into her first great success.

In 1926, Neher went to Berlin to work with Bertolt Brecht. He wrote the role of Polly Peachum in The Threepenny Opera for her, but late in rehearsals her husband died at Davos on 14 August 1928. She was therefore unable to appear at the premiere, but acted the role of Polly in the later performances. Brecht wrote several roles for her, such as Lilian Holiday in Happy End and the title role in his Saint Joan of the Stockyards. She enjoyed success as Marianne in Ödön von Horváth's Tales from the Vienna Woods, and embodied and immortalized Polly in G.W. Pabst's 1931 film version of The Threepenny Opera.

While in Berlin, she practiced boxing with Turkish trainer and prizefighter Sabri Mahir at his studio, which opened to women (including Vicki Baum and Marlene Dietrich) in the 1920s. Posing for a photograph opposite Mahir and equipped with boxing gloves and a maillot, she asserted herself as a "New Woman", challenging traditional gender categories.

In 1932 she married Anatol Becker and left Germany after Adolf Hitler's ascension to power in spring 1933. She first emigrated to Prague, where she worked at the New German Theater, but went on to the Soviet Union in 1934, where she met Gustav von Wangenheim and worked with him at his cabaret Kolonne Links.

In 1936, during the Great Purge, Wangenheim denounced Neher and Becker as Trotskyites and she was arrested on 25 July 1936. Becker was executed in 1937, while Neher was sentenced to ten years in prison and sent to the prison for political convicts in Oryol. 

She is mentioned in the Memoir of Margarete Buber-Neumann. According to the Memoir, in 1940, the Soviets included her in a prisoner exchange with the Nazis, which was part of the NKVD-Gestapo cooperation initiated by Ribbentrop-Molotov Pact. She was sent to Moscow on her transit to Germany where the two met in Butyrka prison. Buber was transferred to Germany but Neher for unknown reasons was returned to the Oryol prison. 

As the German army approached Oryol in October 1941, she was transferred to NKVD Prison No. 2 near Orenburg, where she died of typhus on 26 June 1942, aged 41. Neher (prisoner number 59783) was buried in an unmarked mass grave. Her son, Georg, became a music teacher and only found out about his parents' identity in 1975.

Filmography

The Threepenny Opera (German: Die 3 Groschen-Oper) is a 1931 German musical film directed by G. W. Pabst. It was produced by Seymour Nebenzal's Nero-Film for Tonbild-Syndikat AG (Tobis), Berlin and Warner Bros. Pictures GmbH, Berlin. The film is loosely based on the 1928 musical theatre success The Threepenny Opera by Bertolt Brecht and Kurt Weill. As was usual in the early sound film era, Pabst also directed a French language version of the film, L'Opéra de quat'sous, with some variation of plot details (the French title literally translates as "the four penny opera"). A planned English version was not made. The two existing versions were released by The Criterion Collection on home video.

The Threepenny Opera differs in significant respects from the play and the internal timeline is somewhat vague. The whole of society is presented as corrupt in one form or another. Only some of the songs from the play are used, in a different order.

Legacy

 The Carola-Neher-Street in Berlin Hellersdorf is named after Neher.
 On 5 February 2017, a Last Address commemorative plaque to Carola Neher was affixed to 36 , Moscow.

Literature
 Matthias Wegner: Klabund und Carola Neher – eine Geschichte von Liebe und Tod. Rowohlt, Reinbek bei Hamburg 1996. 
 Tita Gaehme: Dem Traum folgen. Das Leben der Schauspielerin Carola Neher und ihre Liebe zu Klabund.. Dittrich, Köln 1996. .
 Guido von Kaulla: Und verbrenn in seinem Herzen: Die Schauspielerin Carola Neher und Klabund. Herder, Freiburg/Br. 1984
 Michaela Karl: Carola Neher: Die Silberfüchsin. In: Bayerische Amazonen – 12 Porträts. Pustet, Regensburg 2004. . S. 168–189

References

External links
 
 Biography with pictures (German)

1900 births
1942 deaths
Actresses from Munich
German stage actresses
German film actresses
German silent film actresses
People from the Kingdom of Bavaria
Refugees from Nazi Germany in the Soviet Union
20th-century German actresses
20th-century German women singers
German people who died in Soviet detention
Inmates of Black Dolphin Prison
Deaths from typhus